Space Tourists is a feature-length documentary of the Swiss director Christian Frei. The film had its premiere at the Zurich Film Festival in 2009 and has won the "World Cinema Directing Award" at the Sundance Film Festival in 2010.

Plot 
The documentary juxtaposes the journeys of extremely rich tourists traveling with the astronauts into space with the poor Kazakh metal collectors risking their lives in search for rocket waste fallen down into the plains once the Space Shuttle has left. Critics acclaimed this film for its breathtaking imagery and richness of insights.

The film accompanies the first female space traveler who was not a space agency employee, Anousheh Ansari, who paid US$20 million for her flight into space.

The film shows the poor Kazakh metal collectors risking their lives in search for rocket waste that falls literally from the sky. The film features Magnum photographer Jonas Bendiksen, who has followed these metal collectors for a long time.
Charles Simonyi, chief developer of Word and Excel, is seen at his space training and at his tasting of space food.
Another protagonist of the film is Dumitru Popescu, an aerospace enthusiast who applied at the Google Lunar X-Prize of the X-Prize Foundation, founded by Anousheh Ansari.

Reception 
Christopher Campbell wrote on the official bloc of DOC: The Documentary Channel:

Brad Balfour of the Huffington Post emphasizes that the film brings together the two sides of the medal:

Ryan L. Kobrick, author from the magazine The Space Review liked the authenticity of the film:

Awards and festivals 
 DOC: The Documentary Channel 2012: Jury Prize «Best of Doc»
 Cervino Cine Mountain International Mountain Film Festival 2011: Miglior Grand Prix dei Festival 2011
 Beldocs Belgrad 2010: Best Photography Award
 Regio Fun Film Festival Katowice 2010: 2nd Award Documentary Film Competition
 European Documentary Film Festival Oslo 2010: Eurodok Award
 Sundance Film Festival Park City 2010: World Cinema Directing Award
 EBS International Documentary Film Festival Seoul 2010: Special Jury Prize
 Swiss Film Prize 2010: Nomination for the"Best documentary"
 International Documentary Film Festival Amsterdam IDFA 2009: Official Selection.

References

External links

  
 
 Interview with the director

Space tourism
Swiss documentary films
2009 films
Films about space programs
Films shot in Kazakhstan
2009 documentary films
Space program of Kazakhstan
Films directed by Christian Frei
Films scored by Eduard Artemyev
Documentary films about outer space